Sanctuary of Our Lady of the Holy Fountain (Spanish: Santuario de Nuestra Señora de la Fuensanta) is a Baroque-style, Roman Catholic church in the pedanía of Algezares, part of the city of Murcia, in the region of Murcia, Spain.

History
A church at the site began in 1694. The facade was completed in 1705 designed by Toribio Martínez de la Vega. The facade had reliefs and sculptures designed by Jaime Bort, and completed by José Balaguer.

The first retablo in the church was completed by the 17th-century and carved by Antonio Dupar, however, this was destroyed during the Spanish Civil War of 1936. The present retablo is a 10th-century work by Antonio Carrión Valverde and Nicolás Prados López.

During the civil War the church suffered the destruction of its interior which in the half of the 20th century its restoration was completed. The title of the sanctuary corresponds to the Diocese of Cartagena, being declared Bien de Interés Cultural.

See also 
Catholic Church in Spain

References 

Roman Catholic churches in Murcia
Baroque architecture in Murcia
17th-century Roman Catholic church buildings in Spain
Roman Catholic churches completed in 1705